Rajasthan has 10 Municipal Corporations, 34 Municipal Councils and 172 Municipal Boards or Nagar Pachayats. Thus Rajasthan has a total 213 Municipalities or Urban Local Bodies(ULBs). The Rajasthan Municipalities Act, 2009 governs the administration of all the urban local bodies in the state. The Department of Local Self Government of the Rajasthan Government monitors the administration of all the municipalities in the state. The last elections to civic bodies in the state took place in 2019 where 49 municipal bodies with combined 2,105 wards had their elections. Indian National Congress won 961 wards, Bharatiya Janata Party won 737 wards, Bahujan Samaj Party won 16 wards, Communist Party of India (Marxist) won three wards, and the Nationalist Congress Party won two wards.

List of municipal corporations
List of municipal corporations or Nagar Nigams of Rajasthan. Jaipur, Jodhpur, and Kota have two municipal corporations each since October 2019, because their populations have exceeded 10 lakh each. Hence, there are 10 Municipal Corporations in Rajasthan for seven cities. Jaipur has a heritage municipal corporation with 100 wards and a greater Jaipur municipal corporation with 150 wards. Jodhpur has separate ULBs for its northern and southern parts with 80 wards each. Kota also has separate ULBs for its northern and southern parts, with 70 and 80 wards each.

List of municipal councils 

As per census 2011, there were 13 municipal councils. Later, Udaipur and Bharatpur were upgraded to Municipal Corporation. Hence the list have remaining 34 cities.

List of municipal boards
Municipality of 2011 Census, Rajasthan (166)

District - Alwar

District - Baran

District - Barmer

District - Bharatpur

District - Bikaner

District - Banswara

District - Bhilwara

District - Bundi

District - Chittaurgarh

District - Churu

District - Dausa

District - Dhaulpur

District - Dungarpur

District  -  Ganganagar

District  -  Hanumangarh

District - Jaipur

District - Jaisalmer

District - Jalor

District - Jhalawar

District - Jhunjhunun

District - Jodhpur

District - Karauli

District - Kota

District - Nagaur

District - Pali

District - Pratapgarh

District - Rajsamand

District - Sawai Madhopur

District - Sikar

District - Sirohi

District - Tonk

District - Udaipur

See also 

Government of Rajasthan
Politics of Rajasthan

References

Local government in Rajasthan
Rajasthan-related lists
Rajasthan